The 1998 African Women's Championship was the 3rd edition of the international women's association football tournament organized by CAF. Since this edition, the tournament has been organized biennially and was hosted by a country unlike the previous two editions.

Nigeria hosted this edition from 17 to 31 October 1998 and its women's team successfully defended its title, winning it for a 3rd time after beating Ghana 2–0 in the final, with both qualifying for the following year's FIFA Women's World Cup in the United States.

Qualification
A qualification round was installed in the African Women's Championship from this edition onward. With Nigeria qualifying automatically as hosts, the remaining seven spots were determined by a qualification round and a play-off round which took place between March and April 1998.

|}

First leg on March 28–29, Second leg on April 10–12:

Mozambique won 7–2 on aggregate and qualified for the final tournament.

South Africa won 15–0 on aggregate and qualified for the final tournament.

Egypt won 2–1 on aggregate and qualified for the final tournament.

Ghana won 19–0 on aggregate and qualified for the final tournament.

DR Congo won by default and qualified for the final tournament.

Cameroon won by default and qualified for the final tournament.

Morocco won by default and qualified for the final tournament.

Qualified teams
DR Congo, Egypt and Morocco made their first appearances in the tournament. Mozambique failed to arrive for the tournament despite qualifying with Lesotho as a late replacement for Mozambique, also failing to show up.

Squads

Venues

Final tournament 
The top two teams of each group advance to the semi-finals.

The teams were ranked according to points (3 points for a win, 1 point for a draw, 0 points for a loss).

First round

Group A

Group B

Knockout stage 
In the knockout stage, if a match is level at the end of normal playing time, extra time is played (two periods of 15 minutes each) and followed, if necessary, by kicks from the penalty mark to determine the winner, except for the third place match where no extra time is played.

Semi-finals 
Winners qualified for 1999 FIFA Women's World Cup

Third place playoff

Final

Awards

Statistics

Team statistics 

|-
|colspan="10"|Eliminated in the group stage
|-

Goalscorers 
3 goals

  Nkiru Okosieme

2 goals

  Patience Avre
  Rita Nwadike

1 goal

  Mercy Akide
  Stella Mbachu
  Florence Omagbemi

Unknown scorers
  : 18 additional goals.
  : 11 additional goals.
  : 8 additional goals.
  : 7 additional goals.
  : 4 additional goals.
  : 2 additional goals.
  : 2 additional goals.

References

External links 
 Tables & Results at RSSSF

1998 in women's association football
Women's Africa Cup of Nations tournaments
1999 FIFA Women's World Cup qualification
International association football competitions hosted by Nigeria
1998 in African football
1998–99 in Nigerian football